Toy Story 3 is a  2010 American computer-animated comedy-drama film produced by Pixar Animation Studios for Walt Disney Pictures. It is the third installment in the Toy Story series and the sequel to Toy Story 2 (1999). It was directed by Lee Unkrich, the editor of the first two films and the co-director of Toy Story 2, produced by Darla K. Anderson, and written by Michael Arndt, while Unkrich wrote the story along with John Lasseter and Andrew Stanton, respectively, director and co-writer of the first two films. The film's ensemble voice cast, Tom Hanks, Tim Allen, Joan Cusack, Don Rickles, Wallace Shawn, John Ratzenberger, Estelle Harris, Jeff Pidgeon, Jodi Benson, John Morris, Laurie Metcalf and R. Lee Ermey (in his final voice role as Sarge before his death on April 15, 2018), reprise their roles from previous films. Jim Varney, who voiced Slinky Dog in the first two films, died on February 10, 2000, 10 years before the release of the third film, so the role of Slinky was passed down to Blake Clark. The returning cast is joined by Ned Beatty, Michael Keaton, Whoopi Goldberg, Timothy Dalton, Kristen Schaal, Bonnie Hunt, and Jeff Garlin who voice the new characters introduced in this film. In Toy Story 3, Andy Davis (Morris), now 17 years old, is going to college. Woody (Hanks), Buzz Lightyear (Allen), and the other toys are accidentally donated to Sunnyside Daycare, a daycare center, by Andy's mother (Metcalf), and the toys must decide where their loyalties lie. 

In 2004, following disagreements between Disney CEO Michael Eisner and Pixar CEO Steve Jobs, Disney planned to make Toy Story 3 at the new studio Circle 7 Animation unit, with the tentative theatrical release date in early 2008. The script was developed in multiple versions; however, after Disney bought Pixar in early 2006, the Circle 7 version of the film was cancelled as the result of Circle 7's closure. The production was then transferred to Pixar, where a new script was developed. Randy Newman returned to compose the film's musical score.

The film premiered at the Taormina Film Fest in Italy on June 12, 2010, and was released in the United States on June 18. Toy Story 3 was the first film to be released theatrically with Dolby Surround 7.1 sound. Like its predecessors, Toy Story 3 received critical acclaim upon release, with critics praising the vocal performances, screenplay, emotional depth, animation, and Newman's musical score.

The film earned $1.067 billion worldwide, finishing its theatrical run as the highest-grossing film of 2010. It is also the first animated film to reach $1 billion at the box-office, and was the highest-grossing animated film of all time until the release of Frozen in 2013 and was Pixar's highest-grossing film until the release of Incredibles 2 in 2018. With a budget of $200 million, Toy Story 3 is one of the most expensive films of all time. Organizations like the National Board of Review and the American Film Institute named it as one of the top ten films of 2010. The film was nominated for five awards at the 83rd Academy Awards, winning two, and received numerous other accolades. A sequel, Toy Story 4, was released in 2019.

Plot 

Andy, now 17 years old, is preparing to leave for college. He has not played with his toys for years, and only Woody, Buzz Lightyear, Jessie, Bullseye, Rex, Slinky, Hamm, Mr. and Mrs. Potato Head, the Aliens, and three toy soldiers remain. As the despondent toys reflect on their future, the soldiers parachute out the window and leave. Andy intends to take Woody to college, and puts the other toys into a trash bag, to be placed in the attic; however, Andy's mother mistakenly puts the bag outside with the true garbage. The toys narrowly escape from the garbage truck, and, believing Andy deliberately threw them away, get into a donation box in Andy's mother's car with Molly's old Barbie doll. Woody follows in an attempt to bring them back, but is unable to convince the others of Andy's real intentions, and goes along when Andy's mother takes the box of donations to Sunnyside Daycare.

At Sunnyside, Andy's toys are welcomed by the other toys, led by Lots-O'-Huggin' Bear ("Lotso"). The toys (except for Woody) are delighted to learn that Sunnyside never runs out of children, and Barbie is enamored with a Ken doll. Woody attempts to return home, but is instead found by a child from Sunnyside named Bonnie, who brings him home and plays with him and her other toys. Bonnie's toys are shocked that Woody escaped from Sunnyside. Chuckles, a toy clown, explains that he, Lotso, and Big Baby were owned by a girl named Daisy, but were lost during a family trip. When they made it home, Lotso found out that he had been replaced. Disregarding Chuckles' protests, the embittered Lotso lied to Big Baby that Daisy had replaced all of them. They rode a truck to Sunnyside, where Lotso took over, turning it into a toy prison. Chuckles was eventually broken and later found by Bonnie.

Meanwhile, back at Sunnyside after the toddlers play roughly with Andy's toys, Buzz asks Lotso to move the toys to the older children's room. Lotso allows Buzz to go, but when he insists that Andy's toys go as well, Lotso switches Buzz to his original demo mode factory settings, causing him to believe himself to be an actual space ranger under Lotso's command. Meanwhile, Mrs. Potato Head, through an eye she lost in Andy's room, sees Andy searching for his toys. They realize that Woody told the truth about Andy's intentions and try to escape, but Lotso's gang, now assisted by the brainwashed Buzz, imprison them.

Woody returns to Sunnyside, where a Chatter Telephone tells him that there is now no way out, except through the trash chute. Later that night, the toys make their escape plan. After successfully incapacitating Lotso's night watchman, they attempt to restore Buzz's memory, but Rex accidentally resets Buzz to Spanish mode. Spanish Buzz, still believing himself to be an actual space ranger, immediately allies himself with Woody and falls in love with Jessie. The toys reach a dumpster, but are cornered by Lotso and his gang. Woody reveals Lotso's deception to Big Baby, who angrily throws Lotso into the dumpster. As a garbage truck approaches, the toys try to leave, but Lotso pulls Woody into the dumpster. The rest of Andy's toys jump after him as the truck arrives, and all fall inside.

Buzz returns to normal after a television falls onto him inside the truck. The truck takes the toys to a landfill, where they are swept onto a conveyor belt leading to an incinerator. The Aliens spot an industrial claw, but are swept away while running toward it. After narrowly avoiding a shredder and rescuing Lotso, Woody and Buzz help Lotso reach an emergency stop button, only for Lotso to abandon them. The toys fall into the incinerator and resign themselves to their apparent fate, but the Aliens rescue them with the industrial claw. Lotso is later found by a garbage truck driver, who fastens him to his truck's radiator grille as a decoration. Woody and his friends ride another garbage truck back to Andy's house.

Woody leaves a note for Andy, who, thinking the note is from his mother, donates the toys to Bonnie. Andy introduces the toys individually to Bonnie and is surprised to find Woody at the bottom of the donation box. Bonnie recognizes him, and though initially hesitant, Andy passes Woody on to her, and they play together before he leaves. Woody and the other toys witness Andy's departure as they begin their new lives with Bonnie.

In the film's epilogue, Barbie, Ken, and Big Baby have vastly improved Sunnyside and maintain contact with Bonnie's toys through letters. The toy soldiers parachute into Sunnyside, where Ken and Barbie welcome them.

Voice cast 

Credits adapted from the British Film Institute.

 Tom Hanks as Woody
 Tim Allen as Buzz Lightyear
 Joan Cusack as Jessie
 Ned Beatty as Lotso
 John Morris as Andy
 Don Rickles as Mr. Potato Head
 Blake Clark as Slinky Dog
 Wallace Shawn as Rex
 John Ratzenberger as Hamm
 Estelle Harris as Mrs. Potato Head
 Jeff Pidgeon as Aliens
 Jodi Benson as Barbie
 Michael Keaton as Ken
 Emily Hahn as Bonnie
 Timothy Dalton as Mr. Pricklepants
 Kristen Schaal as Trixie
 Jeff Garlin as Buttercup
 Bonnie Hunt as Dolly
 Whoopi Goldberg as Stretch
 Jack Angel as Chunk
 Jan Rabson as Sparks
 John Cygan as Twitch
 Laurie Metcalf as Andy's mother
 Lori Alan as Bonnie's mother
 Bea Miller as Molly
 R. Lee Ermey as Sarge
 Teddy Newton as Chatter Telephone
 Richard Kind as Bookworm
 Bud Luckey as Chuckles
 Javier Fernández Peña as Spanish Buzz
 Charlie Bright as Young Andy / Pea-in-a-Pod
 Amber Kroner as Pea-in-a-Pod
 Brianna Maiwand as Pea-in-a-Pod
 Erik von Detten as Sid
 Jack Willis as Frog
 Woody Smith as Big Baby

Production 
According to the terms of Pixar's initial seven-film deal with Disney, all characters created by Pixar for their films were owned and controlled by Disney. Furthermore, Disney owned the rights to make sequels to all Pixar films up to and including Cars, though Pixar retained the right of first refusal to work on these sequels. In 2004, when the contentious negotiations between the two companies made a split appear likely, Michael Eisner, Disney chairman at the time, put plans in motion to produce Toy Story 3 at a new Disney studio, Circle Seven Animation. Tim Allen, the voice of Buzz Lightyear, indicated a willingness to return, even if Pixar was not on board. It was slated for a theatrical release sometime in spring 2008.

Bradley Raymond, who previously directed Disney's direct-to-video sequels such as The Hunchback of Notre Dame II and The Lion King 1½, was hired to direct the film. Among the scripts Circle Seven had under consideration was one from Teacher's Pet screenwriters Bill and Cheri Steinkellner. Their idea for the film involves Andy and his toys (Woody, Buzz, Hamm, Rex, Slinky, Mr. Potato Head, Jessie, and Bullseye) paying a visit to his grandmother's house for the night because his room is getting remodeled. So a set of Andy's toys and new characters Hee-Hee, and Gladiola are trying to figure out who stole the toys one by one in a whodunit-style murder mystery story. Though it was rejected, Disney was so impressed with the script that this version would have been considered for a possible fourth installment.

The final version of the Circle Seven script was written by Meet the Parents screenwriter Jim Herzfeld. It focused on Andy's toys shipping a malfunctioning Buzz to the factory in Taiwan where he was built called Wocka-Wocka, with the other toys hoping he will be fixed there. While searching on the Internet, they then discovered that many more Buzz Lightyear toys are malfunctioning around the world and the company had issued a massive recall. Fearing Buzz's destruction, a group of Andy's toys (Woody, Rex, Slinky, Mr. Potato Head, Hamm, Jessie, and Bullseye) all ship themselves to Taiwan and venture out to rescue Buzz. At the same time, Buzz meets other toys from around the world that were once loved, but have been recalled such as Rosey, a warm cozy toy, and Jade, a leggy doll with an evening gown. Along with meeting the recalled toys, Buzz also meets a new Star Command action figure that was going to be the replacement of Buzz, Daxx Blastar, along with his accessory pet cat named Comet.

In January 2006, Disney bought Pixar in a deal that put Pixar chiefs Edwin Catmull and John Lasseter in charge of all Disney Animation. Shortly thereafter, Circle Seven Animation was shut down and its alternate version of Toy Story 3 was canceled. The following month, Disney CEO Robert Iger confirmed that Disney was in the process of transferring the production to Pixar. The studio's brain trust, which included John Lasseter, Andrew Stanton, Pete Docter, and Lee Unkrich, had their own idea for a sequel that they had carried around for years. They retreated to the cabin where they first pitched Toy Story, and almost immediately dropped the idea after realizing it wasn't good enough. Unable to come up with anything the first day, they watched the first two movies again, and the next day a new story was starting to take shape. Stanton then wrote a treatment.

This story had no traces of the Circle Seven version of the film since the filmmakers did not read its script: "Not out of spite, but we wanted to start fresh, and not be influenced by what they'd done," said Unkrich. "We didn't look at any of the work they'd done. We really didn't want to know anything about it." In February 2007, Lasseter announced Toy Story 2s co-director, Unkrich, as the sole director of the film instead of himself (Lasseter had directed the first two films and was busy directing Cars 2), and Michael Arndt as screenwriter. 2010 was also announced as the tentative release date.

Unkrich, who had been working with Arndt and story development artists on the film since the middle of 2006, said that he felt pressure to avoid creating "the first dud" for Pixar, since (as of 2010) all of Pixar's films had been critical and commercial successes. In February 2008, the film's plotline was reported: "Woody the cowboy and his toy-box friends are dumped in a daycare center after their owner, Andy, leaves for college."

During the initial development stages of the film, Pixar revisited their work from the original Toy Story and found that, although they could open the old computer files for the animated 3D models, error messages prevented them from editing the files, which necessitated recreating the models from scratch. To create the chaotic and complex junkyard scene near the film's end, more than a year and a half was invested on research and development to create the simulation systems required for the sequence.

Instead of sending Tom Hanks, Tim Allen, and John Ratzenberger scripts for their consideration in reprising their roles, a complete story reel of the film was shown to the actors in a theater. The reel was made up of moving storyboards with pre-recorded voices, sound effects, and music. When the preview concluded, the actors signed on to the film.

The film's art director, Daisuke Tsutsumi, is married to Hayao Miyazaki's niece, who originally inspired the character Mei in Miyazaki's anime film My Neighbour Totoro (1988). Totoro makes a cameo appearance in Toy Story 3.

Dolby Laboratories announced that Toy Story 3 would be the first film to feature theatrical 7.1 surround sound. Thus, even the Blu-ray version would feature original 7.1 audio, unlike other films which were remixed into 7.1 for Blu-ray.

Release

Theatrical 

Toy Story 3 had its worldwide premiere on June 12, 2010, opening at Taormina Film Fest in Italy. In the United States, it premiered on June 13, 2010, at El Capitan Theatre in Hollywood, California. El Capitan also hosted on June 17, 2010, a Toy Story marathon, showing for the first time all three Toy Story films together. The film went into its wide release on June 18, 2010, along with a release to IMAX 3D theaters.

The film was theatrically accompanied with the Pixar short film Day & Night, which focuses on what happens when an animated personification of Day meets his opposite, Night, and the resulting growth for both.

Marketing 
The film's first teaser trailer was released with Up in Disney Digital 3-D on May 29, 2009. On October 2, 2009, Toy Story and Toy Story 2 were re-released as a double feature in Disney Digital 3-D. The first full-length trailer was attached as an exclusive sneak peek and a first footage to the Toy Story double feature on October 12, 2009. A second teaser was released on February 10, 2010, followed by a second full-length trailer on February 11, and appeared in 3D showings of Alice in Wonderland and How to Train Your Dragon. On March 23, 2010, Toy Story and Toy Story 2 were released separately on Blu-ray/DVD combo packs; Toy Story included a small feature of "The Story of Toy Story 3" and Toy Story 2 included one on the "Characters of Toy Story 3."

Mattel, Thinkway Toys, and Lego are among companies that produced toys to promote the film. Fisher Price, a Mattel Company, released Toy Story 3 with 21 3D images for viewing with the View-Master viewer. Disney Interactive Studios also produced a video game based on the film Toy Story 3: The Video Game, which was released for Microsoft Windows, Xbox 360, Wii, PlayStation 3, Nintendo DS, and PSP on June 15, 2010. A PlayStation 2 version was released on October 30, 2010, as part of a PS2 bundle and separately on November 2, 2010 (the same day Toy Story 3 was released on DVD and Blu-ray). It was also the last Disney/Pixar game to be released for PlayStation 2.

Toy Story 3 was featured in Apple's iPhone OS 4 Event on April 8, 2010, with Steve Jobs demonstrating a Toy Story 3-themed iAd written in HTML5. Pixar designed a commercial for the toy Lots-O'-Huggin' Bear and formatted it to appear as if it came from an old VCR recording. The recording was altered with distorted sound, noise along the bottom of the screen, and flickering video, all designed to make it look like a converted recording from around 1983. A Japanese version of the commercial was also released online, with the name "Lots-O'-Huggin Bear" replaced with "Little Hug-Hug Bear" (Japanese:ハグハグベアちゃん/Hagu Hagu Beya-Chan).

On Dancing with the Stars May 11, 2010 episode, the Gipsy Kings performed a Spanish-language version of "You've Got a Friend in Me", which featured a paso doble dance choreographed by Cheryl Burke and Tony Dovolani. Both the song and dance are featured in the film. Toy Story 3 was promoted with airings of the first and second film on several channels in the weeks preceding the film's release, including Disney Channel, Disney XD, and ABC Family. Sneak peeks of Toy Story 3 were also revealed, primarily on Disney Channel.

Oscar campaign 
Toy Story 3s "Not since..." Oscar campaign drew a lot of attention, emphasizing the film's uniqueness and critical acclaim. The campaign consisted of posters featuring characters from the film, comparing Toy Story 3 to previous winners such as The Lord of the Rings: The Return of the King, Shakespeare in Love, Titanic, and more.
Walt Disney Studios Chairman Rich Ross explained they were going for the Best Picture win, not just Best Animated film. The Hollywood Reporter gave the campaign a bronze award in Key Art Awards Winners 2011.

Home media 
Toy Story 3 was released by Walt Disney Studios Home Entertainment in North America on November 2, 2010, in a standard DVD edition, a two-disc Blu-ray Disc, and in a four-disc Blu-ray/DVD/Digital Copy combo pack. Features included behind-the-scenes, including a sneak peek teaser for the then-upcoming Cars 2 (the sequel to the 2006 film Cars). A 10-disc Toy Story trilogy Blu-ray box set arrived on store shelves that same day. A 3D version of the Blu-ray was released in North America on November 1, 2011.

On its first week of release (November 2–7, 2010), it sold 3,859,736 units (equal to $73,096,452), ranking No.1 for the week and immediately becoming the bestselling animated film of 2010 in units sold (surpassing How to Train Your Dragon). As of July 18, 2012, it had sold 10,911,701 units ($185,924,247). It became the bestselling DVD of 2010 in units sold, but it lacked in sales revenue and therefore ranked second behind Avatar on that list. It also sold about 4 million Blu-ray units, ranking as the fourth-bestselling film of 2010.

In the United Kingdom, it broke the record for the largest first day ever for an animated feature in sales revenue, on both DVD and Blu-ray. Additionally, on the first day of its iTunes release, it immediately became the most downloaded Disney film ever. Toy Story 3 was released on 4K UHD Blu-ray on June 4, 2019.

Reception

Box office 
Toy Story 3 earned $415 million in the United States and Canada and $652 million in other countries for a worldwide total of $1.067 billion, becoming the highest-grossing animated film of all time (until it was surpassed by Frozen (2013) in 2014) and the highest-grossing film of 2010. On its first weekend, Toy Story 3 topped the worldwide box office with $145.3 million ($153.7 million with weekday previews), the ninth-largest opening weekend worldwide for an animated feature. On August 27, 2010 – its seventy-first day of release, it surpassed the $1 billion mark, becoming the third Disney film, the second Disney-distributed film in 2010 (after Alice in Wonderland), the first animated film, and the seventh film in cinematic history to do so.

United States and Canada 
In North America, Box Office Mojo estimates that the film sold over 52 million tickets in the U.S. Toy Story 3 earned $41.1 million on its opening day (June 18, 2010) from 4,028 theaters, including $4 million at midnight shows from about 1,500 theaters, setting an opening-day record for an animated film (surpassed by Minions and later Finding Dory).

During its opening weekend, the film topped the box office with $110.3 million, setting an opening-weekend record among Pixar films (surpassed by Finding Dory), films released in June (surpassed by Man of Steel and later Jurassic World), and G-rated films (surpassed by its sequel). The film also achieved the second-largest opening weekend among animated films and the fourth-largest opening weekend among 2010 films. Its average of $27,385 per venue is the second-highest for a G-rated film and the third-highest for an animated feature. Its opening-week gross (Friday through Thursday) of $167.6 million is the second-largest among animated films, the second-largest among 2010 films, and the 23rd-largest of all time. It also achieved the largest 10-day gross among 2010 films. It topped the box office for two consecutive weekends.

Other territories 
Outside of North America, Toy Story 3 topped the box office outside North America three times, in its first ($35 million), second, and sixth weekend (which was its largest). Its highest-grossing market after North America is Japan ($126.7 million), where it is the second-highest-grossing U.S. animated feature (behind Finding Nemo), followed by the UK and Ireland, and Malta (£73.8 million – $116.6 million), where it is the ninth-highest-grossing film, and Mexico ($59.4 million), where it is the second-highest-grossing film. It set opening-weekend records for animated films in Ecuador, Colombia, Mexico, China, Argentina, Hong Kong, Spain, and the UK. Its top international markets were the United Kingdom ($115.4million), Australia ($32.8million), and Brazil ($23.6million).

Critical response 
The site's critical consensus reads, "Deftly blending comedy, adventure, and honest emotion, Toy Story 3 is a rare second sequel that really works." Metacritic, another review aggregator which assigns a normalized rating to reviews, gave the film a score of 92 out of 100 based on 39 critics, indicating "universal acclaim." TIME named Toy Story 3 the "best film of 2010" as did Quentin Tarantino until 2020 where the latter ranked fellow 2010 film The Social Network as the best film of the 2010s. In 2011, TIME ranked the film at #11 on their list of "The 25 All-TIME Best Animated Films." Audiences polled by CinemaScore gave the film an average grade of "A" on an A+ to F scale, the same score as the first film, but down from the "A+" earned by the second film.

A. O. Scott of The New York Times stated "This film—this whole three-part, 15-year epic—about the adventures of a bunch of silly plastic junk turns out also to be a long, melancholy meditation on loss, impermanence and that noble, stubborn, foolish thing called love." Owen Gleiberman from Entertainment Weekly gave the film an "A" saying "Even with the bar raised high, Toy Story 3 enchanted and moved me so deeply I was flabbergasted that a digitally animated comedy about plastic playthings could have this effect." Gleiberman also wrote in the next issue that he, along with many other grown men, cried at the end of the film. Michael Rechtshaffen of The Hollywood Reporter also gave the film a positive review, saying "Woody, Buzz and playmates make a thoroughly engaging, emotionally satisfying return."

Mark Kermode of the BBC gave the film, and the series, a glowing review, calling it "the best movie trilogy of all time." In USA Today, Claudia Puig gave the film a complete 4-star rating, writing "This installment, the best of the three, is everything a movie should be: hilarious, touching, exciting, and clever." Lou Lumenick of the New York Post wrote "Toy Story 3 (which is pointlessly being shown in 3-D at most locations) may not be a masterpiece, but it still had me in tears at the end." Michael Phillips of the Chicago Tribune gave the film 3 out of 4 stars, writing that "Compared with the riches of all kinds in recent Pixar masterworks such as Ratatouille, WALL-E, and Up, Toy Story 3 looks and plays like an exceptionally slick and confident product, as opposed to a magical blend of commerce and popular art." Roger Moore of the Orlando Sentinel, who gave the film 3 out of 4 stars, wrote "Dazzling, scary, and sentimental, Toy Story 3 is a dark and emotional conclusion to the film series that made Pixar famous."

Cahiers du Cinéma put it at the fourth place of its top ten best 2010 films.

In 2018, IndieWire writers ranked the script the tenth best American screenplay of the 21st century.

Accolades 

At the 83rd Academy Awards, Toy Story 3 received nominations for Best Picture, Best Adapted Screenplay, and Best Sound Editing; and won Best Animated Feature and Best Original Song. The film's other nominations include three Annie Awards, three British Academy Film Awards (winning one), five Critics' Choice Movie Awards (winning one), and a Golden Globe Award (which it won). It was named one of the ten best films of 2010 by the National Board of Review (where it also won Best Animated Film) and the American Film Institute.

Fan project 

Iowa brothers Morgan and Mason McGrew spent eight years recreating the film in stop motion. Titled Toy Story 3 in Real Life, the film was shot using iPhones and was uploaded to YouTube on January 25, 2020. The shot-for-shot remake uses the film's original audio. According to Screen Crush, Pixar's parent company Walt Disney Studios gave the McGrews permission to release the film online.

Music  

The film score for Toy Story 3 was composed and conducted by Randy Newman, his sixth for Pixar after Toy Story, A Bug's Life, Toy Story 2, Monsters, Inc., and Cars. Initially, Disney released the soundtrack only as digital download. This was the second instance where Disney did not release the award-winning soundtrack of a Pixar film on CD, the first being Up. In January 2012, Intrada released the Toy Story 3 soundtrack on CD.

In addition to the tracks included in the soundtrack album, the film also uses several other tracks such as "Dream Weaver" by Gary Wright, "Le Freak" by Chic, and Randy Newman's original version of "You've Got a Friend in Me". Furthermore, tracks "Cowboy!" and "Come to Papa" included material from Newman's rejected score to Air Force One. The song "Losing You" from Newman's own album Harps and Angels was also used in the first trailer for the film. The Judas Priest song "Electric Eye" was also used in the film in the temp score for the opening scene of the film.

Sequel 

The sequel, titled Toy Story 4, was released on June 21, 2019, with most of the main cast returning for the film. The film was originally to be directed by John Lasseter and co-directed by Josh Cooley, but in July 2017 Cooley was confirmed as the sole director. Don Rickles had signed on to return to voice Mr. Potato Head, but died before any lines could be recorded. Cooley later confirmed that archived recordings of Rickles would be used instead.

References

Further reading

External links

  at Disney
  at Pixar
 Press kit
 
 
 
 
 

2010 3D films
2010 comedy films
2010 computer-animated films
2010 directorial debut films
2010s American animated films
2010s buddy comedy films
2010s children's animated films
2010s English-language films
3D animated films
American 3D films
American buddy comedy films
American children's animated comedy films
American children's animated fantasy films
American coming-of-age films
American computer-animated films
American prison films
American sequel films
Animated buddy films
Animated coming-of-age films
Best Animated Feature Academy Award winners
Best Animated Feature BAFTA winners
Best Animated Feature Broadcast Film Critics Association Award winners
Best Animated Feature Film Golden Globe winners
Films about dolls
Films about toys
Films about totalitarianism
Films about Barbie
Films directed by Lee Unkrich
Films produced by Darla K. Anderson
Films scored by Randy Newman
Films that won the Best Original Song Academy Award
Films with screenplays by Andrew Stanton
Films with screenplays by John Lasseter
Films with screenplays by Michael Arndt
IMAX films
Pixar animated films
Toy Story
Walt Disney Pictures animated films
Sentient toys in fiction